South Carolina Highway 59 (SC 59) is a  state highway in the northwestern part of the U.S. state of South Carolina. The highway travels in a south-north orientation from just southwest of Fair Play north and then northeast to Seneca, completely within Oconee County.

Route description
SC 59 begins at an interchange with Interstate 85 (I-85) just southwest of Fair Play. The route heads northeast into town, and intersects SC 182/SC 243. After leaving town, SC 59 heads northwest and turns to the northwest to intersect SC 24. The road heads on its northeast trajectory until it meets its northern terminus, an intersection with U.S. Route 76 (US 76), US 123, SC 28 in Seneca.

History

Established in 1942 as a renumbering of SC 181 and part of SC 182, SC 59 traversed from the Georgia state line to Fair Play, then north to Seneca ending at US 76/SC 13/SC 28.  By 1963, SC 59 was truncated at I-85 due to Lake Hartwell submerging the route to Georgia. The portion south of I-85 that was not submerged were downgraded to secondary road Lakeshore Drive (S-37-11). In 2000, SC 59 was extended northwest along West North 1st Street in Seneca, to its current northern terminus with US 76/US 123/SC 28.

Historically, there was one previous SC 59 between 1930-1942; it ran from SC 55 near Clover to SC 58/SC 163 near Lake Wylie. In 1942, the highway was renumbered as SC 557.

Before the construction of Lake Hartwell, SC 59 continued into  Georgia as Georgia State Route 59 (SR 59). SC 59 is not concurrent with I-85 on either side of the lake and the two highways do not officially connect. The section of SR 59 between SR 77 and the shoreline of Lake Hartwell was transferred to county maintenance between 1990 and 1993.

Junction list

See also

References

External links

 
 Mapmikey's South Carolina Highways Page: SC 59

059
Transportation in Oconee County, South Carolina